Gopimohan  (born Pinnamaneni Gopi Mohan) is an Indian screenplay and story writer who works in the Telugu film industry. Gopi Mohan was born in Kurumaddali village Near Vuyyuru, Krishna District of Andhra Pradesh. From childhood, he was passionate about movies.

Gopi Mohan worked in the direction department for N.Shankar's 1999 Telugu film Yamajathakudu and B. Gopal's 2000 Telugu film Vamsi. He assisted in script and direction for Teja's 2001 super hit Telugu film Nuvvu Nenu.

Later he wrote the screenplay in 2002 Telugu super hit film Santosham.
He is associated with successful directors Dasaradh, Sreenu Vytla, Surender Reddy, Teja, G.Nageswara Reddy from past ten years.
In the past, he has written screenplays for movies such as Santosham, Venky, Mr & Mrs Sailajakrishnamurthy, Sri, Ashok, Dhee, Dubai Seenu, Lakshyam, Swagatam, Jhummandi Naadam, Dhenikaina Ready, Greeku Veerudu, Doosukeltha, and Loukyam.

He first wrote the story in the 2008 super hit Telugu film Ready.
He wrote stories for director Sreenu Vytla films Ready, King, Namo Venkatesa, Dookudu, Baadshah.
Gopi Mohan and Kona Venkat worked together for many super hit films as script writers.

Filmography

As an assistant director

As screenplay writer

As story writer

References

External links 
 

Indian male screenwriters
Telugu screenwriters
Living people
Telugu people
1974 births
People from Krishna district
Screenwriters from Andhra Pradesh